The Macedonian Football Supercup  was an annual one-match football competition. The two participating clubs were the Macedonian First Football League champion and the Macedonian Football Cup winner.

The inaugural edition of the trophy was in 2011 which was won by Shkëndija. The competition was played was played for only two more years, in 2013 and 2015, both times he won Vardar.

Matches

2011

2013

2015

Performances

Performance by club

References

External links
Macedonian Football 
Football Federation of Macedonia 

 
Super Cup
National association football supercups